Lymphocyte-activation gene 3, also known as LAG-3, is a protein which in humans is encoded by the LAG3 gene. LAG3, which was discovered in 1990 and was designated CD223 (cluster of differentiation 223) after the Seventh Human Leucocyte Differentiation Antigen Workshop in 2000, is a cell surface molecule with diverse biologic effects on T cell function. It is an immune checkpoint receptor and as such is the target of various drug development programs by pharmaceutical companies seeking to develop new treatments for cancer and autoimmune disorders. In soluble form it is also being developed as a cancer drug in its own right.

Gene 

The LAG3 gene contains 8 exons. The sequence data, exon/intron organization, and chromosomal localization all indicate a close relationship of LAG3 to CD4. The gene for LAG-3 lies adjacent to the gene for CD4 on human chromosome 12 (12p13) and is approximately 20% identical to the CD4 gene.

Protein 
The LAG3 protein, which belongs to immunoglobulin (Ig) superfamily, comprises a 503-amino acid type I transmembrane protein with four extracellular Ig-like domains, designated D1 to D4. When human LAG-3 was cloned in 1990 it was found to have approx. 70% homology with murine LAG3. The homology of pig LAG3 is 78%.

Tissue distribution 

LAG-3 is expressed on activated T cells, natural killer cells, B cells and plasmacytoid dendritic cells.

Function 

LAG3's main ligand is MHC class II, to which it binds with higher affinity than CD4. The protein negatively regulates cellular proliferation, activation, and homeostasis of T cells, in a similar fashion to CTLA-4 and PD-1 and has been reported to play a role in Treg suppressive function.

Fibrinogen-like protein1 FGL1, a liver-secreted protein, is another (major) LAG3 functional ligand independent of MHC-II.

LAG3 also helps maintain CD8+ T cells in a tolerogenic state and, working with PD-1, helps maintain CD8 exhaustion during chronic viral infection.

LAG3 is known to be involved in the maturation and activation of dendritic cells.

Use as a pharmaceutical and as a drug target 

There are three approaches involving LAG3 that are in clinical development.

 The first is IMP321, a soluble LAG3 which activates dendritic cells.
 The second are antibodies to LAG3 which take the brakes off the anti-cancer immune response. An example is relatlimab, an anti-LAG3 monoclonal antibody that is currently in phase 2 clinical testing. A number of additional LAG3 antibodies are in preclinical development. LAG-3 may be a better checkpoint inhibitor target than CTLA-4 or PD-1 since antibodies to these two checkpoints only activate effector T cells, and do not inhibit Treg activity, whereas an antagonist LAG-3 antibody can both activate T effector cells (by downregulating the LAG-3 inhibiting signal into pre-activated LAG-3+ cells) and inhibit induced (i.e. antigen-specific) Treg suppressive activity. Combination therapies are also ongoing involving LAG-3 antibodies and CTLA-4 or PD-1 antibodies.
 The third are agonist antibodies to LAG3 in order to blunt an autoimmune response. An example of this approach is GSK2831781 which has entered clinical testing (for plaque psoriasis).

History

1990 to 1999
LAG3 was discovered in 1990 by Frédéric Triebel (currently Chief Scientific Officer at Immutep) when he headed the cellular immunology group in the Department of Clinical Biology at the Institut Gustave Roussy. An initial characterization of the LAG-3 protein was reported in 1992 showing that it was a ligand for MHC class II antigens while a 1995 paper showed that it bound MHC Class II better than CD4. In 1996 INSERM scientists from Strasbourg showed, in knockout mice that were deficient in both CD4 and LAG-3, that the two proteins were not functionally equivalent. The first characterization of the MHC Class II binding sites on LAG-3 were reported by Triebel's group in 1997. The phenotype of LAG-3 knockout mice, as established by the INSERM Strasbourg group in 1996, demonstrated that LAG-3 was vital for the proper functioning of natural killer cells but in 1998 Triebel, working with LAG-3 antibodies and soluble protein, found that LAG-3 did not define a specific mode of natural killing.

In May 1996 scientists at the University of Florence showed that CD4+ T cells that were LAG-3+ preferentially expressed IFN-γ, and this was up-regulated by IL-12 while in 1997 the same group showed that IFN-γ production was a driver of LAG-3 expression during the lineage commitment of human naive T cells. Subsequent work at the Sapienza University of Rome in 1998 showed that IFN-γ is not required for expression but rather for the up-regulation of LAG-3. The Triebel group in 1998 established that LAG-3 expression on activated human T cells is upregulated by IL-2, IL-7 and IL-12 and also showed that expression of LAG-3 may be controlled by some CD4 regulatory elements. In 1998 the Triebel group showed that, on T cells, LAG-3  down-modulates their proliferation and activation when LAG-3/MHC Class II co-caps with CD3/TCR complex. This relationship was confirmed in 1999 with co-capping experiments and with conventional fluorescence microscopy. In 1999 Triebel showed that LAG-3 could be used as a cancer vaccine, through cancer cell lines transfected with LAG-3.

2000 to 2009.
In 2001 the Triebel group identified a LAG3-associated protein, called LAP, that seemed to participate in immune system down-regulation. Also in 2001 the Triebel group reported finding LAG3 expression on CD8+ tumor-infiltrating lymphocytes, with this LAG3 contributing to APC activation. In August  2002 the first phenotypic analysis of the murine LAG-3 was reported by a team at St. Jude Children's Research Hospital in Memphis. Molecular analysis reported by the St. Jude Children's Research Hospital team in November 2002 demonstrated that the inhibitory function of LAG-3 is performed via the protein's cytoplasmic domain. In 2003 the Triebel group was able to identify the MHC class II signal transduction pathways in human dendritic cells induced by LAG3. while the St. Jude Children's Research Hospital team showed that the absence of LAG3 caused no defect in T cell function.

In May 2004 the St. Jude Children's Research Hospital team showed, through LAG3 knockout mice, that LAG-3 negatively regulates T cell expansion and controls the size of the memory T cell pool. This was in spite of earlier in vitro work that seemed to suggest that LAG-3 was necessary for T cell expansion. Work at Johns Hopkins University published in October 2004 identified LAG3's key role in regulatory T cells. The St. Jude Children's Research Hospital team reported in December 2004 that LAG-3 is cleaved within the D4 transmembrane domain into two fragments that remain membrane-associated: a 54-kDa fragment that contains all the extracellular domains and oligomerizes with full-length LAG-3 (70 kDa) on the cell surface via the D1 domain, and a 16-kDa peptide that contains the transmembrane and cytoplasmic domains and is subsequently released as soluble LAG-3.

In January 2005 scientists at the D'Annunzio University of Chieti–Pescara showed that LAG-3 expression by tumour cells would recruit APCs into the tumour which would have Th1 commitment. Scientists working with AstraZeneca reported in March 2005 that SNPs on LAG3 conferred susceptibility to multiple sclerosis although later work at the Karolinska Institute showed no significant association. In June 2005 the Triebel group showed that antibodies to LAG-3 would result in T cell expansion, through increased rounds of cell division which LAG-3 signalling would otherwise block. In July 2005 scientists at the Institute for Research in Biomedicine in Bellinzona established that LAG3 expression on B cells is induced by T cells

In 2006 scientists at the Istituto Superiore di Sanità in Rome showed that LAG could be used as a biomarker to assess the induction of Th-type responses in recipients of acellular pertussis vaccines.

In April 2007 scientists working at Edward Jenner Institute for Vaccine Research in the UK demonstrated that LAG-3 participates in Treg-induced upregulation of CCR7 and CXCR4 on dendritic cells, resulting in semi-mature dendritic cells with the ability to migrate into lymphoid organs. Scientists at Sun Yat-sen University in China showed that LAG-3 played a role in immune privilege in the eye. In late 2007  the St. Jude Children's Research Hospital group showed that LAG-3 maintained tolerance to self and tumor antigens not just via CD4+ cells but also via CD8+ cells, independently of LAG-3's role on TReg cells.

In 2009 the St. Jude Children's Research Hospital group reported that LAG3 appeared on plasmacytoid dendritic cells. Scientists at the University of Tokyo showed that LAG-3 was a marker of Tregs that secrete IL-10.

2010 to 2015.
In 2010 scientists at Swiss Federal Institute of Technology in Zurich showed that LAG3 was an exhaustion marker for CD8+ T cells specific for Lymphocytic choriomeningitis virus, but alone did not significantly contribute to T-cell exhaustion. A team at Roswell Park Comprehensive Cancer Center showed that CD8+ Tumor-infiltrating lymphocytes that were specific for NY-ESO-1 were negatively regulated by LAG-3 and PD-1 in ovarian cancer. The St. Jude Children's Research Hospital group reported that most LAG3 was housed intracellularly in multiple domains before rapid translocation to the cell surface potentially facilitated by the microtubule organizing center and recycling endosomes during T-cell activation. Scientists at the Istituto Nazionale dei Tumori in Milan, collaborating with the Triebel group, showed that LAG3 defines a potent regulatory T cell subset that shows up more frequently in cancer patients and is expanded at tumor sites. Geneticists working at the National Cancer Institute reported that SNPs in the LAG3 gene were associated with higher risk of multiple myeloma.

In 2011 scientists studying transplantation biology at Massachusetts General Hospital reported that when antibodies to CD40L induced tolerance in allogeneic bone marrow transplantation, LAG3 was part of the mechanism of action in CD8+ cells. Scientists at INSERM, working with the Triebel group, showed that the binding of MHC class II molecules on melanoma cells to LAG3 would increase resistance to apoptosis, providing evidence that antibodies to LAG3 would be relevant in melanoma. The St. Jude Children's Research Hospital group showed that LAG3 can play a modulating role in autoimmune diabetes. Microbiologists at the University of Iowa demonstrated that blockade of PD-L1 and LAG-3 was a valid therapeutic strategy for Plasmodium infection.

In 2012 the St. Jude Children's Research Hospital group showed that LAG-3 and PD-1 synergistically regulate T-cell function in such a way as to allow an anti-tumoral immune response to be blunted. Scientists at Hanyang University in Seoul showed that tetravalent CTLA4-Ig and tetravalent LAG3-Ig could synergistically prevent acute graft-versus-host disease in animal models. In 2013 scientists at the San Raffaele Scientific Institute in Milan showed that LAG3 was a marker of type 1 Tregs.

In 2014 scientists at Stanford University showed that LAG engagement could diminish alloreactive T cell responses after bone marrow transplantation. A group from the California  Department of Public Health identified a subset of HIV-specific LAG3(+)CD8(+) T cells that negatively correlated with plasma viral load. The Istituto Nazionale dei Tumori group, collaborating with Triebel, found LAG3 expression on plasmacytoid dendritic cells is in part responsible for directing an immune-suppressive environment. A group at Korea University in Seoul demonstrated that LAG-3 translocates to the cell surface in activated T cells via the cytoplasmic domain through protein kinase C signaling.

In 2015 scientists at the University of Tokyo showed how LAG3 on Tregs work with TGF beta 3 to suppress antibody production. At Tulane University bacteriologists working at the Tulane National Primate Research Center showed in rhesus macaques that Mycobacterium tuberculosis could work through LAG3 to modulate an anti-bacterial immune response. At National Taiwan University a group showed that LAG3 plays a role in the immunosuppressive capability of Tregs stimulated by Peyer's patch B cells.

References

Further reading

External links 
 
LAG-3: Identification & Validation Of Next Generation Checkpoint Pathway by Frédéric Triebel March 22, 2018

Clusters of differentiation